Mesepa is a village of American Samoa. It is in Tuālāuta on the main island of American Samoa, Tutuila.

References 

Tutuila
Villages in American Samoa